CBDO may refer to:

 CBDO (AM), a radio station (690 AM) licensed to Fort Simpson, Northwest Territories, Canada
 2,2,4,4-Tetramethyl-1,3-cyclobutanediol (CBDO)
 Chief business development officer